The 1975 Tour de France was the 62nd edition of the Tour de France, one of cycling's Grand Tours. The Tour began in Charleroi, Belgium with a prologue individual time trial on 26 June, and Stage 10 occurred on 7 July with a mountainous stage to Pau. The race finished in Paris on 20 July.

Prologue
26 June 1975 – Charleroi to Charleroi,  (ITT)

Stage 1a
27 June 1975 – Charleroi to Molenbeek,

Stage 1b
27 June 1975 – Molenbeek to Roubaix,

Stage 2
28 June 1975 – Roubaix to Amiens,

Stage 3
29 June 1975 – Amiens to Versailles,

Stage 4
30 June 1975 – Versailles to Le Mans,

Stage 5
2 July 1975 – Sablé-sur-Sarthe to Merlin-Plage,

Stage 6
2 July 1975 – Merlin-Plage to Merlin-Plage,  (ITT)

Stage 7
3 July 1975 – Saint-Gilles-Croix-de-Vie to Angoulême,

Stage 8
4 July 1975 – Angoulême to Bordeaux,

Stage 9a
5 July 1975 – Langon to Fleurance,

Stage 9b
5 July 1975 – Fleurance to Auch,  (ITT)

Rest day 1
5 July 1975 – Auch

Stage 10
7 July 1975 – Auch to Pau,

References

1975 Tour de France
Tour de France stages